Kobylany may refer to the following places:
Kobylany, Lesser Poland Voivodeship (south Poland)
Kobylany, Lublin Voivodeship (east Poland)
Kobylany, Subcarpathian Voivodeship (south-east Poland)
Kobylany, Świętokrzyskie Voivodeship (south-central Poland)
Kobylany, Łosice County in Masovian Voivodeship (east-central Poland)
Kobylany, Radom County in Masovian Voivodeship (east-central Poland)